Congers is a suburban hamlet and census-designated place in the town of Clarkstown, Rockland County, New York, United States. It is located north of Valley Cottage, east of New City, across Lake DeForest, south of Haverstraw, and west of the Hudson River. As of the 2010 census, the CDP population was 8,363.

Geography
Congers is located at  (41.146445, −73.944036).

The high percentage of Congers that sits under water is due to the hamlet's emplacement within and between four lakes: Congers Lake, Rockland Lake, Swartwout (also Swarthout) Lake, and the county reservoir, Lake DeForest. Congers is adjacent to Rockland Lake State Park, along the Hudson River.

Demographics

As of the census of 2000, there were 8,303 people, 2,695 households, and 2,244 families residing in the CDP. The population density was 2,635.9 per square mile (1,017.7/km2). There were 2,743 housing units at an average density of 870.8/sq mi (336.2/km2). The racial makeup of the CDP was 85.2% White, 1.8% African American, 0.2% Native American, 8.6% Asian, 0.1% Pacific Islander, 2.1% from other races, and 2.0% from two or more races. Hispanic or Latino people of any race were 7.6% of the population.

Estimated median household income in 2008 was $99,833 (it was $79,493 in 2000), making it one of the highest-earning CDPs in the county.

There were 2,695 households, out of which 40.6% had children under the age of 18 living with them, 70.3% were married couples living together, 9.5% had a female householder with no husband present, and 16.7% were non-families. 13.3% of all households were made up of individuals, and 5.1% had someone living alone who was 65 years of age or older. The average household size was 3.05 and the average family size was 3.36. In the CDP, the population was spread out, with 26.1% under the age of 18, 6.9% from 18 to 24, 29.7% from 25 to 44, 26.6% from 45 to 64, and 10.7% who were 65 years of age or older. The median age was 38 years. For every 100 females, there were 95.4 males. For every 100 females age 18 and over, there were 93.6 males.

History

Congers, named after Abraham B. Conger, was settled in the late 17th century by Dutch, German and English settlers. It was known as Cedar Grove Corner and then Waldberg, which in German means "forest mountain".

In the 19th century the Congers railroad station, three churches, a school, the firehouse and the Central and Globe hotels were built. The first floor of the then Globe hotel on the southeastern corner of Congers Road is presently the Last Chance Saloon. The Clarktown Dutch Reformed Church still stands at the corner of Congers Road and Kings Highway.

Kings Highway was the first major road in the county and for many years the only road from New York to Albany.

Today there exist nine structures with recognized historical markers dating back to the 18th century, including the DeBaum House on Kings Highway, the Smith House on Gilchrest Road and the Snedeker House, where the Commander-in-chief George Washington is believed to have spent a night.

The Swartout estate, which was occupied by George Swartout, was part of a large tract of land confiscated by the government about 1777. It was purchased by General Jacobus Swartwout, who was a collaborator of George Washington, and member of a family who traced their residence in Rockland County to 1660.

DeForest Lake, built in 1955/6, was named after Henry L. Deforest, President of the Spring Valley Works and Supply Company.

Several roads are named after Union Civil War generals, including Grant, Burnside, Sheridan, Sherman, and Rosecrans avenues.

A memorial in honor of 1st Lieutenant Raymond B. Jauss is located at the park adjacent to the railroad crossing at the center of town. Jauss received a Distinguished Service Cross for his actions in World War I, and was killed on July 15, 1918 near Crezancy, France. He was a graduate of Columbia University and his family had a summer home in Congers. Jauss was married to a childhood sweetheart - and fellow Congers resident - Harriet James; their wedding occurred two days before he sailed for Europe.

Congers had regular passenger train service along the New York Central Railroad's West Shore Railroad from Weehawken, New Jersey (opposite Midtown Manhattan) north to Newburgh, Kingston and Albany until 1958. A shortened commuter service continued to West Haverstraw until 1959.

St Paul's Church
Catholics in Congers initially attended St. Peter's Church in Haverstraw. Rev. Thomas McGare of St. Peter's built St Paul's Church, Clarkstown's first Catholic church, on Lake Road in the early 1890s. In 1901 Rev. John A. Nageleisen built mission stations in Rockland Lake, Bardonia, and New City.<ref>Lafort, Remigius. The Catholic Church in the United States of America, Vol. 3: The Province of Baltimore and the Province of New York, Section 1: Comprising the Archdiocese of New York and the Diocese of Brooklyn, Buffalo and Ogdensburg. (New York City: The Catholic Editing Company, 1914), p.400</ref>

Gilchrest Road crossing accident

Education
Congers has one public elementary school, Lakewood Elementary. Congers Elementary School was shut down in 2013 due to unsafe cracks in the structure. Today the building remains as a day care facility. Public school students from Congers attend Felix Festa Middle School in West Nyack and Clarkstown North High School in New City.  Congers is also the home of Rockland Country Day School, which accepts students in grades PreK-12 and was founded in 1959.

Sports
The New York Raiders are a semi-professional rugby league football team that currently plays in the American National Rugby League (AMNRL) competition. They play their home games at Rockland Lake State Park, and are a team partner of the Canberra Raiders of Australia's National Rugby League (NRL).

Tourism

Historical markers

 Congers Lake Dam – Gilchrest Road
 Congers School – 9 Lake Road
 Congers Station – Lake Road & Burnside Avenue
 Dr. Davies Farm – Dr. Davies Road off Route 9W
 Kings Highway – Kings Highway & Congers Road
 Kings Highway & the Long Clove – Old Haverstraw Road
 Paul Farmhouse – Gilchrest Road
 Snedeker Farm – 74 Endicott Street
 Snedeker Landing – Route 9W & Long Clove Roads
 St. Paul's Church – Lake Road at the church

Landmarks and places of interest

 Congers Historical Museum – Second floor of the century-old Congers Railroad Station Park building – Lake Road and Burnside Avenue
 Congers United Methodist Church – On April 3, 1831, Easter Sunday, the first service was held.  The congregation consisted of Presbyterians and former members of the Dutch Reformed Church. Originally, the Congers Church was named the Waldberg Dutch Reformed Church. In 1968, the Evangelical United Brethren Church merged with the Methodist Church and became known as the United Methodist Church. The church's 175th anniversary was celebrated in 2006.

 Dr. Davies Farm – The farmhouse, part of a  farm that ran from Rockland Lake to the Hudson River, was built in 1836 and is of the early frontier Federalist style.  In 1891 Arthur B. Davies and Dr. Lucy Meriwether married and purchased what is now the Davies home farm for $6500.00.  Lucy Virginia Meriweather Davies, M.D., was a relative of Meriwether Lewis (of the Lewis and Clark Expedition) and a general practitioner who, in her time, delivered a significant part of Rockland's population: 7,000 babies. She also farmed the land which her descendants operate today. In 2007 the present Davies owners gave  of its property to the Rockland Center for the Arts (RoCA) of West Nyack, New York.
 Rockland Lake Museum – Rockland Lake State Park – Open all year, but call the office in advance to make sure someone can unlock the room in which the exhibit is contained.  Free. There are exhibits relating to the local ice industry and community life in Rockland Lake Village, including ice harvesting tools.
 John Mini Distinctive Landscapes – The company's  main corporate campus is housed in Congers, making it one of the largest landscape contractor properties in the nation.
 Self-Transcendence Marathon – Held the last week of August at Rockland Lake State Park
 Congers Lake TrailwayCongers Lake Park  – Opened 2011
 Congers Lake West Trailway and Boardwalk – Opened October 2013. Combined trailway is approximately 2.6 miles around Congers Lake.

Notable people

 Will Cunnane, Major League Baseball player
 Brian Fechino, musician and music producer
 Mark Fergus, screenwriter and director, known for the movie Iron Man 
 Edward R. Gleason Jr, Chief of Palisades Interstate Park Police; died in the line of duty
 Adam Gussow, writer, professor, and blues harmonica player, member of the duo Satan and Adam
 Leonidas Hubbard, Jr and Mina Benson Hubbard, writers and explorers of Canada; lived for about two years on Friend StreetRoberta Buchanan, Anne Hart, and Bryan Greene, The Woman Who Mapped Labrador: The Life and Expedition Diary of Mina Hubbard (Montreal: McGill-Queen's University Press, 2005)
 Amy Leventer, marine biologist, micropaleontologist, Antarctic researcher
 James Maritato, professional wrestler
 Chris O'Grady, relief pitcher for the Miami Marlins
 Hayden Panettiere, actress, singer, model; attended Congers Elementary School
 Dan Pasqua, Major League Baseball player, drafted by the New York Yankees in 1982
 Sebastian Stan, Romanian-American actor; attended Rockland Country Day School
 Tracy Wolfson, sportscaster for CBS Sports

References

External links
 Historical Markers and War Memorials in Congers, New York
 Congers Fire Department
 "If You're Thinking of Living in: Congers", Jerry Cheslow, The New York Times'', December 23, 1990
 Dr. Davies Farm

Census-designated places in New York (state)
Hamlets in New York (state)
Census-designated places in Rockland County, New York
Hamlets in Rockland County, New York